Trigonocephalus blomhoffii is a taxonomic synonym that may refer to:

 Gloydius blomhoffii, the mamushi, a venomous pitviper species found in China, Korea and Japan
 Gloydius intermedius, the Central Asian pitviper, a venomous pitviper species found in northern Asia